is the 19th studio album by Japanese entertainer Miho Nakayama. Released through King Records on June 21, 1997, it features the single "March Color". It is the first album to have all songs written by Nakayama.

The album peaked at No. 28 on Oricon's albums chart and sold over 22,000 copies.

Track listing

Personnel
 Miho Nakayama – vocals
 Satoshi Takebe – keyboards (1, 12)
 Makoto Kuriya – keyboards (8)
 Keisuke Araki – keyboards (13)
 Tetsuo Ōtake – synthesizer programming (1, 12)
 Shinya Naitō – synthesizer programming (2–4, 6, 10–11), backing vocals (2–4)
 Shigeo Miyata – synthesizer programming (5, 9, 13)
 Kenji Miyamoto – synthesizer programming (5, 9, 13)
 Yoshinobu Takeshita – synthesizer programming (7–8)
 Satoru Shionoya – piano (11)
 Yoshiyuki Asano – guitar (2)
 Masayoshi Furukawa – guitar (4–6, 13), sitar (5)
 Kazuya Takayama – guitar (7–8)
 Jun Kajiwara – guitar (10)
 Yoshiyuki Sahashi – guitar (11)
 Yūji Toriyama – guitar (12)
 Kenji Takamizu – bass (11)
 Gen Ōgimi – percussion (2)
 Joe Katō Group – strings (1)
 Shirō Sasaki – trumpet (2, 4)
 Masanori Suzuki – trumpet (2, 4)
 Yōichirō Mizue – trumpet (12)
 Mitsukuni Kohata – trumpet (12)
 Hideaki Nakaji – trombone (2, 4)
 Hajime Yamamoto – saxophone (3), flute (3)
 Yoshinari Takegami – saxophone (7, 12)
 Akira Fujiyama – flute (11)
 Masaharu Ishibashi – flute (11)
 Masatsugu Shinozaki Group – strings (11)
 Junko Hirotani – backing vocals (2–3, 6–7)
 Seishirō Kusunose – backing vocals (5)
 Yūko Ōtaki – backing vocals (8, 12)
 Toshinori Yonekura – backing vocals (9)

Charts

References

External links
 
 
 

1997 albums
Miho Nakayama albums
Japanese-language albums
King Records (Japan) albums